The men's individual pursuit class B track cycling event at the 2020 Summer Paralympics will be taking place on 25 August 2021 at the Izu Velodrome, Japan. This class is for the cyclist who is blind or has visual impairments, thus they ride tandem bicycles with a sighted cyclist (also known as the pilot). There will be 14 pairs from 10 different nations competing

Competition format
The competition starts with a qualifying round where it comprises a head-to-head race between the 14 pairs; all 14 pairs will be divided into 7 heats (so 1 heat will consist of 2 pairs). The 2 fastest pairs in the qualifying would qualify to the gold medal final while the 3rd and 4th fastest will qualify to the bronze medal final where they will race head-to-head. The distance of this event is 4000m. The medal finals are also held on the same day as the qualifying.

Schedule
All times are Japan Standard Time (UTC+9)

Records

Results

Qualifying

Finals

References

Men's pursuit B